ACS Tomitanii Constanța is a professional Romanian rugby union club from Constanța, which plays in the CEC Bank SuperLiga, the first division of Romanian club rugby.

Honours
Divizia Națională de Seniori:
Winners (1) : 2017-18
Divizia A:
Runners up (1) : 2016-17

Current squad

 

 

  

 Senior 15s and senior 7s internationally capped players are listed in bold.

See also
 Rugby union in Romania

References

External links
 Squad Details

Romanian rugby union teams
Rugby clubs established in 2009
2009 establishments in Romania
Sport in Constanța